Mleczna may refer to the following places in Poland:
Mleczna, Lower Silesian Voivodeship in Gmina Jordanów Śląski, SW Poland
Mleczna (river), a river in central Poland
Other places called Mleczna (listed in Polish Wikipedia)